The Technical University of Moldova (UTM) is a higher technical educational institution located in Chișinău, Moldova, and is the only such institute in the country to be accredited by the state.

History 
The Technical University of Moldova was founded in 1964, under the name The Polytechnic Institute of Chișinău, as an education center with engineering and economic specialties transferred from the Moldova State University.

The university had begun with 5,140 students and 278 teachers within 5 faculties: Electrotechnics, Mechanics, Technology, Construction and Economy. Since 1964, the university has grown extensively, producing 66,000 specialists and becoming an important educational, scientific and cultural center.

On 15 July 2022, TUMnanoSAT, Moldova's first satellite, built by the Technical University of Moldova, was launched into space.

Faculties 
The university offers courses in about 80 specialties and specialisations, within the following 10 faculties:

 Faculty of Energetics
 Faculty of Engineering and Management in Mechanics
 Faculty of Engineering and Management in Machine Building
 Faculty of Engineering and Management in Electronics and Telecommunications (Before Electro-Physics faculty)
 Faculty of Computers, Informatics and Microelectronics (Before Electro-Physics faculty)
 Faculty of Technology and Management in Food Industry
 Faculty of Light Industry
 Faculty of Urbanism and Architecture
 Faculty of Cadastre, Geodesy and Construction
 Faculty of Economic Engineering and Business

Basketball 
UTM features a team that competes in the Moldovan Super League.

See also 
 List of universities in Moldova
 Education in Moldova

References

External links 
 Technical University of Moldova Website

Education in Chișinău
Technical University of Moldova
1964 establishments in the Moldavian Soviet Socialist Republic
Educational institutions established in 1964